Mary Jane Green was a Confederate spy and bushwhacker.

Early life and education

Not much is known about Mary Jane Green's early life. She claims to have been born in Sutton, Braxton County (currently known as West Virginia). Green's level of education was unknown, but she was illiterate. Considering her lack of education she probably came from a poor family. According to public records, she was likely either born around 1839 or 1846, as there was a Mary Jane Green living in Sutton who was 11 at the time of the 1850 census. Records indicate that she may have also been the Mary Jane Green who married William Watson during the war, in Jefferson, West Virginia in 1864, at age 18, which puts her age closer to surviving descriptions of her. She had three brothers, who also became guerillas.

Civil War
At the time of her first arrest in August 1861 for smuggling confederate intelligence, Green was described as a teenager. She was incarcerated in Wheeling, Virginia until that December, when she managed to offend General Rosencrans so greatly that he had her sent to her home county in hopes that the Union troops there would shoot her. She was required to swear an oath to the U.S. in order to be released, which she did with no sincerity.  Upon her release she was arrested again in May 1862, this time for cutting telegraph wires near Weston, Virginia in men's clothes. That April she was released on parole and then re-incarcerated for a bad attitude. She was reportedly arrested seven separate times.

Green was steadfastly loyal to the Confederacy and raged and spat vitriol at every Union soldier she encountered, even while arrested. At one point in Antheneum, she had to be tied down, and when a guard took pity and untied her after she calmed, Green attacked him with a brick.

The last known records of her are during the Civil War, when she was transferred from prison in Atheneum to the official Union and Confederate exchange point in City Point, Virginia.

See also
 List of female American Civil War soldiers

References

Further reading
Women of the War: Female Espionage Agents for the Confederacy
Vindicating the Confederacy: Confederate Female Spies and their Memoirs 1863-1876
"THEY CANNOT CATCH GUERRILLAS IN THE MOUNTAINS ANY MORE THAN A COW CAN CATCH FLEAS": GUERRILLA WARFARE IN WESTERN VIRGINIA, 1861-1865

19th-century spies
Female wartime spies
American spies
American Civil War spies
Women in the American Civil War
People of West Virginia in the American Civil War
People from West Virginia
People of the Confederate States of America
Female wartime cross-dressers in the American Civil War
Braxton County, West Virginia
19th-century births
Year of birth uncertain
Year of death unknown